The Assistant (original title: La Volante) is a 2015 drama-thriller film directed by Christophe Ali and Nicolas Bonilauri and starring Nathalie Baye and Malik Zidi.

Plot 
One night, while driving his pregnant wife Audrey to the hospital, Thomas accidentally knocks down and kills a young man on the road. Several years later, Marie-France, the mother of the deceased man, is still unable to recover from the tragedy. She becomes a personal assistant for Thomas, who remains completely unaware of her identity. Soon, Marie-France carries out a methodical plan, making herself become indispensable to Thomas, while interfering in his family affairs and also approaching his son Léon.

Cast 
 Nathalie Baye as Marie-France Ducret
 Malik Zidi as Thomas Lemans
 Johan Leysen as Éric Lemans 
 Sabrina Seyvecou as Audrey Lemans
 Jean Stan Du Pac as Léo Lemans
 Pierre-Alain Chapuis as Jean-Marc
 Hervé Sogne as Pierre
 Aïssatou Diop as Iman

References

External links 
 

2015 films
2015 psychological thriller films
2015 thriller drama films
2010s French-language films
French psychological thriller films
French thriller drama films
Belgian thriller drama films
French films about revenge
Belgian films about revenge
2015 drama films
2010s French films